Euston railway station (also known as London Euston) is a central London railway terminus in the London Borough of Camden, managed by Network Rail. It is the southern terminus of the West Coast Main Line, the UK's busiest inter-city railway. Euston is the eleventh-busiest station in Britain and the country's busiest inter-city passenger terminal, being the gateway from London to the West Midlands, North West England, North Wales and Scotland.

Intercity express passenger services are operated by Avanti West Coast and overnight services to Scotland are provided by the Caledonian Sleeper. London Northwestern Railway and London Overground provide regional and commuter services. Trains run from Euston to the major cities of Birmingham, Manchester, Liverpool, Glasgow and Edinburgh. Euston tube station is directly connected to the main concourse, while Euston Square tube station is nearby.

Euston was the first inter-city railway terminal in London, planned by George and Robert Stephenson. The original station was designed by Philip Hardwick and built by William Cubitt, with a distinctive arch over the station entrance. The station opened as the terminus of the London and Birmingham Railway (L&BR) on 20 July 1837. Euston was expanded after the L&BR was amalgamated with other companies to form the London and North Western Railway, leading to the original sheds being replaced by the Great Hall in 1849. Capacity was increased throughout the 19th century from two platforms to fifteen. The station was controversially rebuilt in the mid-1960s, including the demolition of the Arch and the Great Hall, to accommodate the electrified West Coast Main Line, and the revamped station still attracts criticism over its architecture. Euston is to be the London terminus for the planned High Speed 2 railway and the station is being redeveloped to handle it.

Name and location 
The station is named after Euston Hall in Suffolk, the ancestral home of the Dukes of Grafton, the main landowners in the area during the mid-19th century.

Euston station is set back from Euston Square and Euston Road on the London Inner Ring Road, between Cardington Street and Eversholt Street in the London Borough of Camden. It is one of 19 stations in the country that are managed by Network Rail. As of 2016, it is the fifth-busiest station in Britain and the busiest inter-city passenger terminal in the country. It is the sixth-busiest terminus in London by entries and exits. Euston bus station is directly in front of the main entrance.

History 
Euston was the first inter-city railway station in London. It opened on 20 July 1837 as the terminus of the London and Birmingham Railway (L&BR). The old station building was demolished in the 1960s and replaced with the present building in the international modern style.

The site was chosen in 1831 by George and Robert Stephenson, engineers of the L&BR. The area was mostly farmland at the edge of the expanding city, and adjacent to the New Road (now Euston Road), which had caused urban development.

The station and railway have been owned by the L&BR (1837–1846), the London and North Western Railway (LNWR) (1846–1923), the London, Midland and Scottish Railway (LMS) (1923–1948), British Railways (1948–1994), Railtrack (1994–2002) and Network Rail (2002–present).

Old station 

The original station was built by William Cubitt. The first plan was to construct a building near the Regent's Canal in Islington that would provide a useful connection for London dock traffic, before Robert Stephenson proposed an alternative site at Marble Arch. This was rejected by a provisional committee, and a proposal to end the line at Maiden Lane was rejected by the House of Lords in 1832. A terminus at Camden Town was announced by Stephenson the following year, receiving Royal Assent on 6 May, before an extension was approved in 1834, allowing the line to reach Euston Grove.

Initial services were three outward and inwards trains each, reaching  in just over an hour.

The final gradient from Camden Town to Euston involved a crossing over the Regent's Canal that required a gradient of over 1 in 68. Because steam trains at the time could not climb such an ascent, they were cable-hauled on the down line towards Camden until 1844, after which they used a pilot engine. The L&BR's Act of Parliament prohibited the use of locomotives in the Euston area, following concerns of local residents about noise and smoke from locomotives toiling up the incline.

The station building was designed by the classically trained architect Philip Hardwick with a  trainshed by structural engineer Charles Fox. It had two  platforms, one each for departures and arrival. The main entrance portico, known as the Euston Arch was also by Hardwick, and was designed to symbolise the arrival of a major new transport system as well as being seen as "the gateway to the north". It was completed in May 1838 and cost £35,000 (now £).

The first railway hotels in London were built in Euston. Two hotels designed by Hardwick opened in 1839, located either side of the Arch; the Victoria on the west had basic facilities while the Euston on the east was designed for first-class passengers.

The station grew rapidly as traffic increased. Its workload increased from handling 2,700 parcels a month in 1838 to 52,000 a month in 1841. By 1845, 140 people were working there and trains began to run late because of a lack of capacity. The following year, two new platforms (later 9 and 10) were constructed on vacant land to the west of the station that had been reserved for Great Western Railway services. The L&BR amalgamated with the Manchester & Birmingham Railway and the Grand Junction Railway in 1846 to form the LNWR, with the company headquarters at Euston. This required a new block of offices to be built between the Arch and the platforms.

The station's facilities were greatly expanded with the opening of the Great Hall on 27 May 1849, which replaced the original sheds. Architectural sculptor John Thomas contributed eight allegorical statues representing the cities served by the line. The station stood on Drummond Street, further back from Euston Road than the front of the modern complex; Drummond Street now terminates at the side of the station but then ran across its front. A short road called Euston Grove ran from Euston Square towards the arch.

An additional bay platform (later platform 7) opened in 1863, and was used for local services to Kensington (Addison Road). The station gained two new platforms (1 and 2) in 1873 along with a separate entrance for cabs from Seymour Street.

The continued growth of long-distance railway traffic led to a major expansion along the station's west side starting in 1887. The work involved rerouting Cardington Street over part of the burial ground (later St James's Gardens) of St James's Church, Piccadilly, which was located some way from the church. To avoid public outcry, the remains were reinterred at St Pancras Cemetery. Two extra platforms (4 and 5) opened in 1891, and four further departure platforms (now platforms 12–15) opened on 1 July 1892, bringing the total to fifteen, along with a separate booking office on Drummond Street.

The line between Euston and Camden was doubled between 1901 and 1906. A new booking hall opened in 1914, constructed on part of the cab yard. The Great Hall was fully redecorated and refurbished between 1915 and 1916, and again in 1927. The station's ownership was transferred to the London, Midland and Scottish Railway (LMS) in the 1923 grouping.

Apart from the lodges on Euston Road and statues now on the forecourt, few relics of the old station survive. The National Railway Museum's collection at York includes Edward Hodges Baily's statue of George Stephenson, both from the Great Hall; the entrance gates; and an 1846 turntable discovered during demolition.

London, Midland and Scottish Railway redevelopment
By the 1930s Euston had become congested, and the LMS considered rebuilding it. In 1931 it was reported that a site for a new station was being sought, with the most likely option being behind the existing station in the direction of Camden Town. The LMS announced in 1935 that the station (including the hotel and offices) would be rebuilt using a government loan guarantee.

In 1937 it appointed the architect Percy Thomas to produce designs. He proposed a new American-inspired station that would involve removing or resiting the arch, and included office frontages along Euston Road and a helicopter pad on the roof. The redevelopment work began on 12 July 1938, when  of limestone was extracted for the new building and some new flats constructed to rehouse people displaced by the works. The project was then shelved indefinitely because of World War II.

The station was damaged several times during the Blitz in 1940. Part of the Great Hall's roof was destroyed, and a bomb landed between platforms 2 and 3, destroying offices and part of the hotel.

New station 

By the 1950s, passengers considered Euston to be in squalor and covered in soot, leading to a full redecoration and restoration in 1953, including the removal of an enquiry kiosk in the middle of the Great Hall. Ticket machines were modernised. The Arch was now surrounded by further property development and kiosks, and was in need of restoration.

British Railways announced a complete rebuild of Euston that could accommodate a fully electrified West Coast Main Line in 1959. Because of the restricted layout of track and tunnels at the northern end, enlargement could be accomplished only by expanding southwards over the area occupied by the Great Hall and the Arch. Consequently, the London County Council were given notice that the Arch and the Great Hall would be demolished, which was granted on the proviso that the Arch would be restored and re-sited. This was financially unviable as BR estimated it would cost at least £190,000 (now £).

The Arch demolition was formally announced by the Minister of Transport, Ernest Marples in July 1961, but drew immediate objection from the Earl of Euston, the Earl of Rosse and John Betjeman. Experts did not believe the work would cost £190,000 and speculated it could be done more cheaply by foreign labour. On 16 October 1961, 75 architects and students staged a formal demonstration against the demolition inside the Great Hall, and a week later Sir Charles Wheeler led a deputation to speak with the Prime Minister Harold Macmillan. Macmillan replied that as well as the cost, there was nowhere large enough to relocate the Arch in keeping with its surroundings.

Demolition began on 6 November and was completed within four months. Since 1996, proposals have been formulated to reconstruct it as part of the planned redevelopment of the station, including the station's use as the London terminus of the High Speed 2 line.

The new station was constructed by Taylor Woodrow Construction to a design by London Midland Region architects of British Railways, William Robert Headley and Ray Moorcroft, in consultation with Richard Seifert & Partners. Redevelopment began in summer 1962 and progressed from east to west, including the demolition of the Great Hall, while an  temporary building housed ticket offices and essential facilities. The project was planned to keep Euston working to 80% capacity during the works, with at least 11 platforms in operation at any time. While services were diverted elsewhere where practical, the station remained operational throughout the works.

The first phase of construction involved building 18 new platforms with two track bays to handle parcels above this, along with a signal and communications building and various staff offices. The parcel deck was reinforced by 5,500 tons of structural steelwork. The signalling on the main routes leading out of the station was completely reworked along with the electrification of the lines, including the British Rail Automatic Warning System. Fifteen platforms had been completed by 1966, and the full electric service began on 3 January. A fully automated parcel depot, sited above platforms 3 to 18, opened on 7 August 1966. The new station was opened by Queen Elizabeth II on 14 October 1968.

It opened with integrated automatic ticket facilities and a wide variety of shops; the first of its kind for any British station.

The original plan was to construct office buildings over the station, whose rents would help fund the cost of the rebuilding, but this was scrapped after a government White Paper was released in 1963 that restricted the rate of commercial office development in London.

In 1966, a "Whites only" recruitment policy for guards at the station was dropped after the case of Asquith Xavier, a migrant from Dominica, who had been refused promotion on those grounds, was raised in Parliament and taken up by the then Secretary of State for Transport, Barbara Castle.

A second development phase by Richard Seifert & Partners began in 1979, adding  of office space along the front of the station in the form of three low-rise towers overlooking Melton Street and Eversholt Street. The offices were occupied by British Rail, then by Railtrack, and finally by Network Rail, which has now vacated all but a small portion of one of the towers. These buildings are in a functional style; the main facing material is polished dark stone, complemented by white tiles, exposed concrete and plain glazing.

The station has a single large concourse, separate from the train shed. Originally, there were no seats installed there to deter vagrants and crime, but these were added following complaints from passengers. A few remnants of the older station remain: two Portland stone entrance lodges and a war memorial. A statue of Robert Stephenson by Carlo Marochetti, previously in the old ticket hall, stands in the forecourt.

There is a large statue by Eduardo Paolozzi named Piscator dedicated to German theatre director Erwin Piscator at the front of the courtyard, which as of 2016 is reported as deteriorating. Other pieces of public art, including low stone benches by Paul de Monchaux around the courtyard, were commissioned by Network Rail in 1990. The station has catering units and shops, a large ticket hall and an enclosed car park with over 200 spaces. The lack of daylight on the platforms compares unfavourably with the glazed trainshed roofs of traditional Victorian railway stations, but the use of the space above as a parcels depot released the maximum space at ground level for platforms and passenger facilities.

Privatisation 
Ownership of the station transferred from British Rail to Railtrack in 1994, passing to Network Rail in 2002 following the collapse of Railtrack. In 2005 Network Rail was reported to have long-term aspirations to redevelop the station, removing the 1960s buildings and providing more commercial space by using the "air rights" above the platforms.

In 2007, British Land announced that it had won the tender to demolish and rebuild the station, spending some £250 million of its overall redevelopment budget of £1 billion for the area. The number of platforms would increase from 18 to 21. In 2008, it was reported that the Arch could be rebuilt. In September 2011, the demolition plans were cancelled, and Aedas was appointed to give the station a makeover.

In July 2014 a statue of navigator and cartographer Matthew Flinders, who circumnavigated the globe and charted Australia, was unveiled at Euston; his grave was rumoured to lie under platform 15 at the station, but had been relocated during the original station construction and in 2019 was found behind the station during excavation work for the HS2 line.

High Speed 2 

In March 2010 the Secretary of State for Transport, Andrew Adonis announced that Euston was the preferred southern terminus of the planned High Speed 2 line, which would connect to a newly built station near Curzon Street and Fazeley Street in Birmingham. This would require expansion to the south and west to create new sufficiently long platforms. These plans involved a complete reconstruction, involving the demolition of 220 Camden Council flats, with half the station providing conventional train services and the new half high-speed trains. The Command Paper suggested rebuilding the Arch, and included an artist's impression of it.

The station is to have seven new platforms dropped from an original planned eight, taking the total to 23, with 10 dedicated to HS2 services and 13 to conventional lines at a low level. The flats demolished for the extension would be replaced by significant building work above. The Underground station would be rebuilt and connected to adjacent Euston Square station. As part of the extension beyond Birmingham, the Mayor of London's office believed it will be necessary to build the proposed Crossrail 2 line via Euston to relieve 10,000 extra passengers forecast to arrive during an average day.

In 2016, the Mayor Sadiq Khan endorsed the plans and suggested that all services should terminate at Old Oak Common while a more appropriate solution is found for Euston.

The current scheme does not provide any direct access between High Speed 2 at Euston and the existing High Speed 1 at St Pancras. In 2015, plans were announced to link the two stations via a travelator service. Platforms 17 and 18 closed in May and June 2019 for High Speed 2 preparation work.

Preparation for the 2019 start of tunnelling works for the Euston approach was made with the demolition in 2018 of the Euston Downside Carriage Maintenance Depot.

In January 2019, demolition began on the two 1979 office towers in front of the station, in preparation for High Speed 2: demolition finished in December 2020. The third tower at 1 Eversholt Street is not part of these plans. Two hotels on Cardington Street adjacent to the west of the station were also demolished.

On 21 August 2019, the Department for Transport (DfT) ordered an independent review of the project, chaired by the British civil engineer Douglas Oakervee. The Oakervee Review was published by the Department for Transport on 11 February 2020, alongside a statement from the Prime Minister confirming that HS2 would go ahead in full, with reservations. One of the review's conclusions was that the (then) proposed design for the station rebuild was 'not satisfactory' and that "the management of the whole Euston project is muddled and the current governance arrangements for Euston station need to be changed". In summer 2020, the government asked the chairman of Network Rail, Sir Peter Hendy, to chair an oversight board; in October 2020, the Architects' Journal reported that more than £100m had already been spent on engineering and architectural design fees for the new station.

Criticism 

Euston's 1960s style of architecture has been described as "a dingy, grey, horizontal nothingness" and a reflection of "the tawdry glamour of its time", entirely lacking in "the sense of occasion, of adventure, that the great Victorian termini gave to the traveller". Writing in The Times, Richard Morrison stated that "even by the bleak standards of Sixties architecture, Euston is one of the nastiest concrete boxes in London: devoid of any decorative merit; seemingly concocted to induce maximum angst among passengers; and a blight on surrounding streets. The design should never have left the drawing-board – if, indeed, it was ever on a drawing-board. It gives the impression of having been scribbled on the back of a soiled paper bag by a thuggish android with a grudge against humanity and a vampiric loathing of sunlight". Michael Palin, explorer and travel writer, in his contribution to Great Railway Journeys titled "Confessions of a Trainspotter" in 1980, likened it to "a great bath, full of smooth, slippery surfaces where people can be sloshed about efficiently".

Access to parts of the station is difficult for people with physical disability. The introduction of lifts in 2010 made the taxi rank and underground station accessible from the concourse, though some customers found them unreliable and frequently broken down. Wayfindr technology was introduced to the station in 2015 to help people with visual impairment to navigate the station.

The demolition of the original buildings in 1962 was described by the Royal Institute of British Architects as "one of the greatest acts of Post-War architectural vandalism in Britain" and was approved directly by Harold Macmillan. The attempts made to preserve the earlier building, championed by Sir John Betjeman, led to the formation of the Victorian Society and heralded the modern conservation movement. This movement saved the nearby high Gothic St Pancras station when threatened with demolition in 1966, ultimately leading to its renovation in 2007 as the terminus of HS1 to the Continent.

Incidents

On 26 April 1924, an electric multiple unit collided with the rear of an excursion train carrying passengers from the FA Cup Final in Coventry. Five passengers were killed. The accident was blamed on poor visibility owing to smoke and steam under the Park Street Bridge.

On 27 August 1928, a passenger train collided with the buffer stops. Thirty people were injured.

On 10 November 1938, a suburban service collided with empty coaches after a signal was misinterpreted. 23 people were injured.

The accident was blamed on a lack of track circuiting and no proper indication of when platforms were occupied.

1973 IRA attack 

Extensive but superficial damage was caused by an IRA bomb that exploded close to a snack bar at approximately 1:10 pm on 10 September 1973, injuring eight people. A similar explosive had detonated 50 minutes earlier at King's Cross. The Metropolitan Police had received a three-minute warning, and were unable to evacuate the station completely, but British Transport Police managed to clear much of the area just before the explosion. In 1974, the mentally ill Judith Ward confessed to the bombing and was convicted of this and other crimes, despite the evidence against her being highly suspect and Ward retracting her confessions. She was acquitted in 1992; the true culprit has yet to be identified.

National Rail services
Euston has services from four different train operators:

Avanti West Coast operates InterCity West Coast services:
1 train per hour to  /  (alternating) via Birmingham
1 to  via Preston. Additional services operate to/from Preston, Lancaster, Carlisle during peak times
3 to  via Stockport:
2 via Stoke-on-Trent 
1 via Crewe
1 to  via , Crewe and Runcorn
2 trains per day to 
4 trains per day on Monday-Friday to 

London Northwestern Railway operates regional and commuter services.
2 trains per hour to Tring
1 to Milton Keynes Central 
2 to  via 
1 to Northampton
1 to Crewe via 
1 to  Liverpool Lime Street via Birmingham New Street

London Overground operates local commuter services.
4 trains per hour to  via the Watford DC Line

Caledonian Sleeper operates two nightly services to Scotland from Sunday to Friday inclusive.
Lowland sleeper to Glasgow Central and Edinburgh Waverley via

London Underground 

Euston was poorly served by the early London Underground network. The nearest station on the Metropolitan line was Gower Street, around five minutes' walk away. A permanent connection did not appear until 12 May 1907, when the City & South London Railway opened an extension west from Angel. The Charing Cross, Euston & Hampstead Railway opened an adjacent station on 22 June in the same year; these two stations are now part of the Northern line. Gower Street station was quickly renamed Euston Square in response. A connection to the Victoria line opened on 1 December 1968.

The underground network around Euston is planned to change depending on the construction of High Speed 2. Transport for London (TfL) plans to change the safeguarded route for the proposed Chelsea–Hackney line to include Euston between Tottenham Court Road and King's Cross St Pancras. As part of the rebuilding work for High Speed 2, it is proposed to integrate Euston and Euston Square into a single tube station.

See also 
Birmingham Curzon Street railway station (1838-1966) - the Birmingham counterpart to the original Euston station 
Pennsylvania Station (1910–1963) – a similarly demolished and rebuilt station

References

Notes

Citations

Sources

External links 

Station information on Euston railway station from Network Rail
Euston Station and railway works – information about the old station from the Survey of London online.
Euston Station Panorama
Euston London Guide

Railway stations in the London Borough of Camden
DfT Category A stations
Former London and Birmingham Railway stations
Railway stations in Great Britain opened in 1837
Railway stations served by Avanti West Coast
Railway stations served by Caledonian Sleeper
Railway stations served by London Overground
Railway stations served by West Midlands Trains
Network Rail managed stations
Railway termini in London
Architectural controversies
Richard Seifert buildings
London station group
Stations on the West Coast Main Line